An innovator is a person or organization who is one of the first to introduce into reality something better than before. 

Innovator and 'Innovators may also refer to:
The Innovators: How a Group of Inventors, Hackers, Geniuses, and Geeks Created the Digital Revolution, 2014 book written by Walter Isaacson
The Innovators: The Men Who Built America, 2012 American television miniseries docudrama
Innovators (Mobile Suit Gundam 00),  characters from the Japanese anime television series Mobile Suit Gundam 00
 Innovator potato
 Innovator (rapper), South Korean rapper born 1988
 Innovator Mosquito Air, Canadian helicopter from Innovator Technologies
 Bird Innovator, an amphibious airplane from Bird Corporation

See also 
 Philips Innovator, yacht
 Innovation (disambiguation)